This is a list of current and former Roman Catholic churches in the Roman Catholic Diocese of Camden. The diocese covers the counties of  Atlantic, Camden, Cape May, Cumberland, Gloucester, and Salem in southern New Jersey.

Camden

Atlantic City

Other areas

References

 
Camden